The 2021 GT4 European Series is the fourteenth season of the GT4 European Series, a Sports car racing championship organised by Stéphane Ratel Organisation (SRO). The season will begin at Monza on 16 April, and will end at the Circuit de Barcelona-Catalunya on 10 October.

Calendar
A 2021 calendar was announced on 23 October 2020 at SRO's annual press conference at the 2020 24 Hours of Spa.

Entry list
The full season entry list was released on 31 March and contained 37 cars.

Race calendar and results
Bold indicates the overall winner.

Championship standings

Scoring system
Championship points were awarded for the first ten positions in each race. After Q1 and Q2 the drivers of the car setting the fastest time in the Silver, Pro-Am and Am Cups will be awarded one point. Entries were required to complete 75% of the winning car's race distance in order to be classified and earn points. Individual drivers were required to participate for a minimum of 25 minutes in order to earn championship points in any race.

Drivers' championship

Team's championship
Championship points were awarded for the first ten positions in each race. After Q1 and Q2 the Team of the car setting the fastest time in the Silver, Pro-Am and Am Cups will be awarded one point. For the Teams titles Silver, Pro-Am and Am, only the highest-finishing car per Team will score points; all other cars entered by that Team will be invisible as far as scoring points are concerned.

Silver Cup

Pro-Am

Am

Notes

References

External links

GT4 European Series
GT4 European Series
GT4 European Series